Infatigable was a 40-gun Valeureuse-class frigate of the French Navy, launched at Le Havre in 1799. She took part in Allemand's expedition of 1805. The British Royal Navy captured her in 1806. She was taken into the Royal Navy but never used and she was broken up in 1811.

French career 
Infatigable was under the command of capitaine de vaiseau Meynne between 22 October 1801 and 26 December 1802. First she sailed from Havre to Cherbourg. Then she carried troops from Cherbourg to Cap-Français via Douvres, Dunkirk, and Flessingue. From Cap-Français she conducted a mission to Havana, from which she returned to Cap-Français before sailing back to Brest.

Around 31 July 1803 capitaine de vaisseau Troude brought the colonial prefect (governor) of "Aure" and passengers from Cap-Français back to Lorient.

The same squadron burnt the Lady Jane Halliday, the Nelly, and the Themis at Nevis.

Between 11 and 20 November 1805, Infatigable, under the command of capitaine de vaisseau Joseph-Maurice Girardias, was in Île-d'Aix roads.

Capture 
A four-ship squadron of the Royal Navy under Samuel Hood captured her in the action of 25 September 1806, together with Gloire, Minerve and Armide after they had left Rochefort the evening before. Infatigable was under the command of capitaine de vaisseau "Giradiers". French casualties were heavy as the French squadron was carrying troops.

Fate 
The Royal Navy took her into service as HMS Immortalite but never used her. She was broken up in 1811.

Citations

References 
 
  (1671-1870)
 

Valeureuse-class frigates
Frigates of the Royal Navy
Age of Sail frigates of France
1799 ships
Ships built in France
Captured ships